Liyakot Hossain Khoka (born 31 December 1964) is a Bangladeshi politician and the incumbent member of the Bangladesh Parliament representing the Narayanganj-3 constituency.

Career
Khoka was elected to the parliament from Narayanganj-3 as a Jatiya Party candidate in 2014 and re-elected in 2018.

Controversy
On 4 November 2020, Khoka said he would "gladly accept the death penalty after he kills Emmanuel Macron, the president of France, for insulting the Prophet Muhammad". He also appealed to the prime minister of Bangladesh to sever diplomatic ties with France.

References

Living people
1964 births
Jatiya Party politicians
10th Jatiya Sangsad members
11th Jatiya Sangsad members
Place of birth missing (living people)